2TM is an Australian commercial radio station based in Tamworth, New South Wales and is part of the Super Radio Network.

The station operates from modern studios that are situated on Goonoo Goonoo Road in Hillvue, a suburb of Tamworth and is situated across the road from the Big Golden Guitar along with sister station, 92.9FM.

About 

The station broadcasts on the 1287 AM band and has been operating in Tamworth since 1935.

In 1940 the 2TM was one of just six stations in New South Wales to become independent following the disbandment of the Broadcast Network.

In 1973 a panel was created by 2TM to recognise and award professional and amateur country artists. This led to the creation of what is known today as the Golden Guitar Awards - officially the Country Music Awards of Australia. The Golden Guitar Awards are held annually at the Tamworth Country Music Festival. 2TM ran the awards until 1992 when it was handed to the Country Music Association of Australia.

In 2019 2TM returned to its country roots by introducing live programming of the Tamworth Country Music Festival. The station also reintroduced the Australian country music charts to regular programming the same year. In 2020, 2TM broadcast live from the Tamworth Country Music Awards for the first time.

Reach 
2TM's ACMA broadcasting licence area is Tamworth RAI.  This is the largest of two area maps that cover Tamworth and reaches an area of13 260 km² .   This enables 2TM to reach Tamworth, Gunnedah, Barraba, Manilla, Attunga, Bendemeer, Kootingal, Werris Creek, Quirindi, Murrurundi, Nundle and Curlewis and the villages in between.

Programming 

 Talk Overnight with Gary Stewart from 12am
 Early Mornings with Richard King from 5am
 Breakfast with Sally-Anne Whitten from 6am
 The John Laws Show from 9am
 The Classic Lunch with Michael Raymond from 12pm
 Afternoons with Scott Gilchrist from 1pm
 Talkin' Sport from 3pm Mondays to Thursdays
 The Australian Country Music Top Ten Tracks from 3pm Fridays
 Sportsday NSW from 6pm
 Talk Tonight with Graeme Gilbert from 8pm
 A Country Mile with Sally-Anne Whitten (Australian Country Music Show) from 6am Saturdays

Local news with Toni Ambrogetti airs every hour on weekdays

References 

Tamworth, New South Wales
Country radio stations in Australia
Radio stations established in 1935
Radio stations in New South Wales